Phoenicia ( pronounced féniisya in Arabic) was a Montreal-based Canadian Lebanese / pan-Arab publication that started in December 2003 as a weekly newspaper. 

Beginning of 2011, and after 6 years as a weekly newspaper, it continued publishing once every two weeks (26 issues per year) and starting June 2013, became a monthly publication (12 issues per year). It stopped publication in April 2014. 

Phoenicia was a multilingual newspaper that had published since its start in 2003 in three languages: Arabic, French and English. Beginning with its 16 September 2011, Phoenicia added a fourth language section in Armenian published once every two weeks. When Phoenicia turned into a monthly publication, the Armenian news page was discontinued with last Armenian page supplement published on 3 May 2013. 43 Armenian supplement pages were published in total.

Phoenicia was distributed as a free newspaper throughout Lebanese, Arab and Armenian communities in Montreal, Laval and South Shore (Quebec), in Ottawa (Ontario) and in Halifax (Nova Scotia).

See also
List of newspapers in Canada

2003 establishments in Quebec
2014 disestablishments in Quebec
Arab-Canadian culture
Armenian-Canadian culture
Defunct newspapers published in Quebec
Defunct weekly newspapers
Lebanese-Canadian culture
Middle Eastern-Canadian culture in Quebec
Multicultural and ethnic newspapers published in Canada
Newspapers published in Montreal
Publications established in 2003
Publications disestablished in 2014
Weekly newspapers published in Quebec